is the second album from the Japanese pop idol group Cute, released on April 18, 2007 on the Zetima label. Although it is actually a mini-album, containing only five tracks, it is considered their second album.

The album was  released in two versions: Regular Edition and Limited Edition, the latter containing also a DVD with videos.

The album debuted at number 21 in the Oricon Weekly Albums Chart, remaining in the chart for 2 weeks.

Track listing 
All songs written and composed by Tsunku.

CD
 That's the Power
 
 Performed by Erika Umeda, Chisato Okai, and Kanna Arihara
 
 Performed by Saki Nakajima and Mai Hagiwara
 
 Performed by Airi Suzuki
 
 Performed by Maimi Yajima
Limited Edition DVD
 JUMP (Close-up Live Ver. at Nippon Seinenkan) (from "°C-ute Debut Tandoku Concert 2007 Haru ~Hajimatta yo! Cutie Show~")

Charts

References

External links 
 2 Mini ~Ikiru to Iu Chikara~ entry on the Up-Front Works official website

2007 albums
Cute (Japanese idol group) albums
Zetima albums
Japanese-language albums
Albums produced by Tsunku